Zehnder Harry "Dick" Confair (January 11, 1906 – January 26, 1982) was an American politician from Pennsylvania who served as a Republican member of the Pennsylvania State Senate for the 24th district from 1959 to 1968 and the 23rd district from 1969 to 1972.

Early life and education
Confair was born on January 11, 1906, to Charles H. and Rena (Baum) Confair.  He graduated from Berwick High School and received a B.S. degree from the Wharton School of the University of Pennsylvania.

Career
He was the founder of the Confair Bottling Company and worked as president of the First Federal Savings and Loan Association.  He was a member of the board of directors for Williamsport chamber of commerce and the Northern Central Bank and Trust.

Death and legacy
Confair died on January 26, 1982, in Williamsport, Pennsylvania, and was interred at Twin Hills Memorial Park in Muncy, Pennsylvania.

Interstate 80 in Pennsylvania is named the Z.H. Confair Memorial Highway in his honor, as is the I-80 bridge over the West Branch of the Susquehanna River near Milton, Pennsylvania.

References

1906 births
1982 deaths
20th-century American politicians
American bankers
Burials in Pennsylvania
Republican Party Pennsylvania state senators
People from Berwick, Pennsylvania
Wharton School of the University of Pennsylvania alumni